Samuel Stewart Ellsworth (October 13, 1790 – June 4, 1863) was an American politician who served one term as a U.S. Representative from New York from 1845 to 1847.

Biography 
Born in Pownal, Vermont, Ellsworth attended the common schools.
He moved to Penn Yan, New York, in 1819 and engaged in mercantile pursuits.
Supervisor of Milo, Yates County from 1824 to 1828.
He served as judge of Yates County 1824–1829.
He served in the State assembly in 1840.

Congress 
Ellsworth was elected as a Democrat to the Twenty-ninth Congress (March 4, 1845 – March 3, 1847).

Death 
He died in Penn Yan, New York, June 4, 1863.
He was interred in Lake View Cemetery.

References

External links 
 

1790 births
1863 deaths
Democratic Party members of the United States House of Representatives from New York (state)
New York (state) state court judges
Democratic Party members of the New York State Assembly
People from Pownal, Vermont
People from Penn Yan, New York
19th-century American politicians
19th-century American judges